No Man Is an Island may refer to:

 "No man is an island", originally "No man is an Iland", a famous line from Devotions upon Emergent Occasions, a 1624 prose work by English poet John Donne
 No Man Is an Island (film), 1962 war film
 No Man Is an Island (album), the 1972 debut album from reggae singer Dennis Brown
 No Man Is an Island, a 1955 book by the Trappist monk Thomas Merton
 "No Man Is an Island", a 1953 episode of the Hallmark Hall of Fame, about the life of John Donne
 "No Man Is an Island", a song by Tenth Avenue North
 "No Man Is an Island", a song by Losers
 No-Man, an English art-pop band founded in 1987 as No Man Is an Island (Except the Isle of Man)
 "No Man Is an Island" (The Script song), from the album Freedom Child

See also
 "No Man Is an Iland", the opening and closing song on the album Grace by Ketil Bjørnstad
 Nomanisan Island